Norma e Felice is an Italian sitcom. It is a spin-off of Nonno Felice.

Cast

Gino Bramieri: Nonno Felice
Franca Valeri: Norma
Paola Onofri: Ginevra
Franco Oppini: Franco Malinverni

See also
List of Italian television series

External links
 

Italian television series
1995 Italian television series debuts
1996 Italian television series endings